Herman Selderhuis (born 21 May 1961) is a Dutch minister, theologian and professor of church history and church polity.

Life
Herman Johan Selderhuis was born on 21 May 1961. He grew up in a family that was not involved in the church. At the age of 15, he began attending church services and was subsequently baptized and joined the Christian Reformed Churches. He attended the grammar school at the Ichthus College in his hometown, Enschede. From 1981 to 1988 he studied theology at the Theological University of Apeldoorn of the Christian Reformed Churches. His doctoral exam was on Church History. Selderhuis was minister of the Christian Reformed Church in Hengelo from 1987 until 1992. The following five years he was minister of the Christian Reformed Church in Zwolle. He graduated in 1994 on the subject of Martin Bucer on Marriage and Divorce. In January 1997 he became Professor of Church History and Church Law as the successor to Willem van 't Spijker at the Theological University in Apeldoorn.

Career
He is currently professor of church history and church polity at the Theological University of Apeldoorn. He also served as the academic curator of the John Lasco Library (Emden, Germany) from 2010 - 2017 and is president of the International Calvin Congress.  He is also director of Refo500, the international platform for knowledge, expertise, ideas, products and events, specializing in the 500 year legacy of the Reformation. In November 2020 he became boardmember of the international Martin Luther foundation.

Bibliography
Some of his books are:

 John Calvin: A Pilgrim's Life 
 
 Marriage and Divorce in the Thought of Martin Bucer 
 Handbook of Dutch Church History  
 Calvin's Theology of the Psalms  
 Martin Luther: A Spiritual Biography

References

External links
 

1961 births
Living people
20th-century Calvinist and Reformed theologians
20th-century Dutch Calvinist and Reformed ministers
20th-century Dutch educators
20th-century Dutch male writers
20th-century Dutch non-fiction writers
21st-century Calvinist and Reformed theologians
21st-century Dutch Calvinist and Reformed ministers
21st-century Dutch educators
21st-century Dutch male writers
21st-century Dutch non-fiction writers
Calvinist and Reformed writers
Canonical theologians
Christian Reformed Churches Christians from the Netherlands
Converts to Protestantism from atheism or agnosticism
Academic staff of the Theological University of Apeldoorn
Dutch Calvinist and Reformed theologians
Historians of Christianity
People from Enschede
Reformation historians